Medium Raw: A Bloody Valentine to the World of Food and the People Who Cook is a memoir by Anthony Bourdain and the follow-up to Bourdain's bestselling Kitchen Confidential. Medium Raw addresses Bourdain's rise to stardom following the success of Kitchen Confidential. No longer a cook and now finding himself a television personality, Bourdain gives his opinion on many of his fellow television chefs (most of whom, he argues, are not chefs at all due to never having worked in a restaurant) and how the restaurant industry has changed in the ten years since Kitchen Confidential was published.

Critical reception
From Doug French:

From Geoff Nicholson of San Francisco Chronicle:

Samantha Nelson of The A.V. Club gave the book a C−:

Josh Ozersky of Time Magazine enjoyed the book:

References

External links
 Review by Doug French of the Mises Institute

2010 non-fiction books
American non-fiction books
Ecco Press books